The Cashel Palace Hotel is a palladian mansion now operating as a 61 bedroom hotel and restaurant in Cashel, County Tipperary, Ireland.

History
It was constructed around 1730 for Theophilus Bolton in a Georgian-style and was designed by the architect Edward Lovett Pearce. It was originally the residence of various Church of Ireland archbishops, until they moved to Waterford. It was the original home of the Bolton Library.

Restaurant

The hotel's main restaurant, The Bishop's Buttery, was a fine dining restaurant that was awarded one Michelin star in 1982 and 1983. The Egon Ronay Guide awarded the restaurant one star in 1982. The kitchen style of the restaurant was Modern. The head chef and owner at the time of the Michelin star was Declan Ryan.

Current status
The hotel ceased trading in 2015 and was later sold to developer John Magnier. In 2017, redevelopment started with plans in to reopen the hotel by 2019. The reopening of the hotel was delayed to 2020 and has since been deferred again to late 2021 following the onset of COVID-19. It reopened in 2022.

See also
List of Michelin starred restaurants in Ireland

References

External links
 

Restaurants in the Republic of Ireland
Michelin Guide starred restaurants in Ireland
Buildings and structures in County Tipperary
Edward Lovett Pearce buildings
Hotels in County Tipperary
Queen Anne architecture in Ireland
Palladian architecture in Ireland